Polk Township is one of thirteen townships in Washington County, Indiana, United States. As of the 2010 census, its population was 2,626 and it contained 1,131 housing units.

Geography

Cities, towns, villages
 New Pekin (east half)

Unincorporated towns
 Bartle at 
 Blue River at 
 Daisy Hill at 
 Old Pekin at 
(This list is based on USGS data and may include former settlements.)

Adjacent townships
 Franklin Township (north)
 Finley Township, Scott County (northeast)
 Monroe Township, Clark County (east)
 Wood Township, Clark County (south)
 Jackson Township (southwest)
 Pierce Township (west)
 Washington Township (northwest)

Cemeteries
The township contains these three cemeteries: Mead, Mount Pleasant and Tash.

School districts
 East Washington School Corporation

Political districts
 Indiana's 9th congressional district
 State House District 73
 State Senate District 45

References
 United States Census Bureau 2007 TIGER/Line Shapefiles
 United States Board on Geographic Names (GNIS)
 IndianaMap

External links
 Indiana Township Association
 United Township Association of Indiana

Townships in Washington County, Indiana
Townships in Indiana